The 1958 Cupa României Final was the 20th final of Romania's most prestigious football cup competition. It was disputed between Ştiinţa Timişoara and Progresul București, and was won by Ştiinţa Timişoara after a game with 1 goal. It was the first cup for Ştiinţa Timişoara.

Match details

See also 
List of Cupa României finals

References

External links
Romaniansoccer.ro

1958
Cupa
Romania
Cupa României Final